Matthew or Matt Scott may refer to:

Sports
Matthew Scott (footballer, born 1867) (1867–1897), English footballer for Sunderland
Matthew Scott (footballer, born 1872) (1872–?), Scottish footballer (Airdrieonians FC and Scotland)
Matthew Scott (cricketer) (born 1979), English cricketer
Matt Scott (basketball) (born 1985), American wheelchair basketball player
Matthew Scott (rugby league) (born 1985), Australian rugby league footballer
Matt Scott (rugby union) (born 1990), Scottish rugby union player
Matt Scott (American football) (born 1990), American football quarterback
Matt Scott (sports journalist) (fl. 2007–present), British sports journalist
Matt Scott (sports journalist) (fl. 2007–present), American sports (Kansas Basketball) journalist

Others
Matthew T. Scott (1828–1891), American agriculturist
Matthew P. Scott (fl. 1980s–present), American development biologist
Matt Scott (musician) (fl. 1995–1996), American musician with Chevelle
Matthew Scott (Stargate) (2009–2011), fictional character in Stargate Universe
Matthew Scott (police commissioner) (fl. 2016–present), English police commissioner

See also